Sandviken may refer to:

Places

Finland
 Hietalahti, Helsinki (known as "Sandviken" in Swedish), a neighbourhood in Helsinki, Finland
 Hietalahti Stadium (known as "Sandviken Stadium" in Swedish), a stadium in Vaasa, Finland

Norway
 Sandviken, Norway, a neighbourhood in the city of Bergen in Vestland county

Sweden
 Sandviken, a town and the seat of Sandviken municipality
 Sandviken Municipality, a municipality around the town of Sandviken
 Sandviken, Södertälje, a village in Södertälje municipality 
 Sandviken, Blekinge, a beach in Sweden

Sports
 Sandvikens IF, a Swedish football club
 Sandvikens AIK, a Swedish sports club
 IL Sandviken, a Norwegian sports club

See also
Sandvik, a global company founded in Sandviken, Sweden
Sandvika (disambiguation)